Andrei Dăescu (born 28 August 1988) is a Romanian professional tennis player playing on the ITF Men's Circuit and the ATP Challenger Tour and current member of the Romania Davis Cup Team. On February 27, 2012, he reached his highest ATP singles ranking of 654 whilst his best doubles ranking was 355 on April 2, 2012.

He is coached by Silviu Tănăsoiu and John Roddick and he is also an alumnus of the University of Oklahoma.

Career finals

Doubles finals: 3 (1–2)

Davis Cup

Singles performances (0–1)

Doubles performances (0–1)

References

External links

 
 
 

1988 births
Living people
University of Oklahoma alumni
Romanian male tennis players
21st-century Romanian people